Don Abel may refer to:

 Don Abel (politician) (born 1952), politician in Ontario, Canada
 Don G. Abel (1894–1980), American judge